was a Japanese painter and illustrator, noted for his work in pioneering the Hanshinkan Modernism trend in  yōga (Western-style) portraiture and nude painting in early 20th century Japanese painting.

Biography
Koide was born in what is now the Shinsaibashi area of Chūō-ku Osaka. Interested in art from childhood, he studied Nihonga in elementary and middle school. In 1907, he applied to the western arts department of Tokyo School of Fine Art, but failed his entrance examinations, and was accepted into the Nihonga department instead. Although he was able to study under famed Nihonga painter Shimomura Kanzan, he was still drawn to oil painting. After graduating in 1914 he returned to Osaka and continued to paint and entered a yōga-style portrait group titled "N-Family" into the 1919 6th Nikakai (Second Division Society) Exhibition, where he won the Chōgyū Prize. This painting is now recognized by the Agency of Cultural Affairs of the Japanese government as an Important Cultural Properties of Japan. In the Nikakai exhibition of 1920 his portrait of the "Young Girl Omme" received the Nika Prize.
He received numerous commissions following these successes, and experimented with a variety of media, including painting on glass. From 1921–1922, he travelled to France, and established his atelier in Osaka in 1924. (This studio is now preserved at the Ashiya City Art Museum). In his later years, Koide was especially known for his nudes.
He died in Ashiya, Hyōgo in 1931.

Noted Works
, 1919, Ohara Art Museum, National Important Cultural Property
, 1923, National Museum of Modern Art, Tokyo, Japan
, 1929, National Museum of Modern Art, Tokyo, Japan 
,  1930, Ohara Museum of Art, Tokyo, Japan

References
 Keene, Donald. Dawn to the West. Columbia University Press; (1998). 
 Mason, Penelope. History of Japanese Art . Prentice Hall (2005). 
 Miyoshi, Masao. Postmodernism and Japan. Duke University Press (1986) 
 Sadao, Tsuneko. Discovering the Arts of Japan: A Historical Overview. Kodansha International (2003). 
 Schaarschmidt Richte. Japanese Modern Art Painting From 1910 . Edition Stemmle. 
 Weisenfeld, Gennifer. MAVO: Japanese Artists and the Avant-Garde, 1905-1931. University of California Press (2001). 

1887 births
1931 deaths
People from Osaka
Artists from Osaka Prefecture
People of Meiji-period Japan
Japanese portrait painters
20th-century Japanese painters